The grey-crowned yellowthroat (Geothlypis poliocephala) is a species of bird in the family Parulidae.
It is found in Belize, Costa Rica, El Salvador, Guatemala, Honduras, Mexico, Nicaragua, Panama, and the United States.
Its natural habitats are subtropical or tropical moist shrubland and heavily degraded former forest.

References

External links
 

grey-crowned yellowthroat
Birds of Central America
grey-crowned yellowthroat
Taxonomy articles created by Polbot